Jan van Ruysbroek is the name of:

 John of Ruysbroeck (c. 1290–1381), Flemish scholar and mystic
 Jan van Ruysbroeck (architect) (15th century), Flemish architect

See also 
 Ruisbroek (disambiguation), two Belgian villages